Aqup'ukru (Quechua aqu sand, p'ukru hole, pit, gap in a surface, "sand hole", Hispanicized spelling Acopugro) is a  mountain in the Andes of Peru. It is located in the Puno Region, Lampa Province, Paratía District. Aqup'ukru is situated south of the mountain Yanawara, west of the lake Sayt'uqucha and southeast of the mountain Pachakutiq.

References

Mountains of Puno Region
Mountains of Peru